Charles S. "Charlie" Devine (May 7, 1928 – Oct. 1, 2008) was a politician in Newfoundland. He represented Labrador West in the Newfoundland House of Assembly from 1962 to 1966.

The son of Louis A. Devine and Alice Hearn, he was born in St. John's. He worked in the family business and then worked as a civilian executive in the United States Air Force. He later moved to Labrador, where he worked as a statistician for the Iron Ore Company of Canada. Devine founded the Labrador City newspaper The Aurora. He also served as president of the local Chamber of Commerce and Rotary Club. He retired to St. John's, where he helped establish the Canadian Association of Retired Persons.

He died in St. Clare's Hospital in St. John's at the age of 80.

References 

1928 births
2008 deaths
Politicians from St. John's, Newfoundland and Labrador
People from Labrador City
Liberal Party of Newfoundland and Labrador MHAs